Giron or Girón may refer to:

People
Girón or Giron is a Spanish and French surname and refer to the following people:
 Alicia Girón García (1938-2020), Spanish librarian
 Gabriel Girón (born 1988), Mexican basketball player
 José Antonio Girón, Falangist politician
 Pedro Girón (disambiguation), several people with this name
 Socorro Girón, a Puerto Rican historian
 Marcos Giron, American tennis player
 Charles Giron, Swiss painter

Places
 Giron, France
 Giron, the Sami-language name of Kiruna, Sweden
 Girón, Santander, a town in Colombia
 Playa Girón, location of the failed 1961 Bay of Pigs Invasion
 Girón, Azuay, a town and canton in Ecuador

Others
Girón (newspaper), official organ of the Communist Party provincial committee in Matanzas, Cuba
Girón Formation, a geological formation in the Andes